Discotettix belzebuth is a groundhopper found in western Malesia, belonging to the subfamily Scelimeninae; it is the type species of its genus.

See also
Phaesticus azemii
Discotettix selangori
Scelimena hafizaii
Scelimena razalii
Gavialidium phangensum

References

Caelifera
Insects of Malaysia
Orthoptera of Asia